Jazz Impressions is the first compilation album of songs by American jazz pianist and composer Vince Guaraldi. The compilation was released in March 1964.

Background
In an effort to capitalize on the unexpected success of the song "Cast Your Fate to the Wind" two years prior, Fantasy Records hastily compiled what Guaraldi historian and author Derrick Bang referred to as "something of a clandestine 'greatest hits' collection." All songs included were culled from Vince Guaraldi Trio (1956) and A Flower Is a Lovesome Thing (1958). Fantasy belatedly released what they considered a true "greatest hits" collection in 1980, four years after Guaraldi's untimely death. That album, simply titled Greatest Hits, picked up where Jazz Impressions left off, collecting songs from the remainder of Guaraldi's Fantasy catalogue.

Fantasy re-released Jazz Impressions in 1975 and 1987. It was remastered for CD release in 1995.

Track listing

Personnel
Credits adapted from 1995 CD liner notes.

Vince Guaraldi Trio
 Vince Guaraldi – piano
 Eddie Duran – guitar
 Dean Reilly – double bass 

Additional
 Grover Sales Jr. – liner notes

References

1964 compilation albums
Fantasy Records albums
Albums produced by Vince Guaraldi
Vince Guaraldi compilation albums
Albums arranged by Vince Guaraldi
Vince Guaraldi albums